Hans Hermann Fränkel (19 December 191626 August 2003), usually Anglicized to Hans Frankel, was a German-American sinologist noted for his studies of Chinese poetry and literature and his 25-year tenure as professor of Chinese at Yale University.

Life and career
Hans H. Frankel was born on 19 December 1916 in Berlin, Germany. His father, Hermann Fränkel, was a renowned scholar of Classical Latin and Greek. Because of the family's Jewish ancestry, the Fränkels fled to the United States during the Nazi Party's rise to power in the early 1930s. They settled in Palo Alto, California, where Hermann Fränkel became a professor of Classics at Stanford University.  Hans attended Stanford as an undergraduate, graduating with a B.A. in 1937.  He then attended the University of California, Berkeley as a graduate student, earning an M.A. in Spanish in 1938 and a Ph.D. in Romance literature in 1942.

During World War II, Frankel worked for the US military as a translator of German, Spanish, and Italian.  Military commanders recognized his linguistic talents, and he was encouraged to begin studying Chinese.  After the war ended, Frankel moved to China, teaching Western languages at Peking University from 1947 to 1949.  While at Peking University, Frankel met Chang Ch'ung-ho, a well-known poet, calligrapher and kunqu opera singer.  They married in November 1948 and had two children.

Frankel and his wife returned to the United States in 1949, where he lectured and did research at Berkeley.  He became an assistant professor of Chinese at Stanford in 1959, then went to Yale University in 1961, where he taught until his retirement in 1987.  He published a large number of books and articles on Chinese poetry and literature, and his translation of the Ballad of Mulan was used in Disney's 1998 animated film.

Selected works
Biographies of Meng Hao-jan, (Berkeley: University of California Press, 1951; revised 1961).
The Flowering Plum and the Palace Lady: Interpretations of Chinese Poetry, (New Haven: Yale University Press, 1976).

Notes

Further reading
Knechtges, David. "Hans Frankel, Teacher and Scholar", T'ang Studies 13 (1995): 1-5.

1916 births
2003 deaths
People from Palo Alto, California
People from North Haven, Connecticut
American sinologists
German sinologists
Jewish emigrants from Nazi Germany to the United States
People from Berlin
Stanford University alumni
University of California, Berkeley alumni
Stanford University faculty
University of California, Berkeley faculty
Yale University faculty